A bumper is a structure attached to or integrated with the front and rear ends of a motor vehicle, to absorb impact in a minor collision, ideally minimizing repair costs. Stiff metal bumpers appeared on automobiles as early as 1904 that had a mainly ornamental function. Numerous developments, improvements in materials and technologies, as well as greater focus on functionality for protecting vehicle components and improving safety have changed bumpers over the years. Bumpers ideally minimize height mismatches between vehicles and protect pedestrians from injury. Regulatory measures have been enacted to reduce vehicle repair costs and, more recently, impact on pedestrians.

History
Bumpers were at first just rigid metal bars. George Albert Lyon invented the earliest car bumper. The first bumper appeared on a vehicle in 1897, and it was installed by Nesselsdorfer Wagenbau-Fabriksgesellschaft, a Czech carmaker. The construction of these bumpers was not reliable as they featured only a cosmetic function. Early car owners had the front spring hanger bolt replaced with ones long enough to be able to attach a metal bar. G.D. Fisher patented a bumper bracket to simplify the attachment of the accessory. The first bumper designed to absorb impacts appeared in 1901. It was made of rubber and Frederick Simms gained a patent for this invention in 1905.

Bumpers were added by automakers in the mid-1910s, but consisted of a strip of steel across the front and back. Often treated as an optional accessory, bumpers became more and more common in the 1920s as automobile designers made them more complex and substantial. Over the next decades, chrome-plated bumpers became heavy, elaborative, and increasingly decorative until the late 1950s when US automakers began establishing new bumper trends and brand-specific designs. The 1960s saw the use of lighter chrome-plated blade-like bumpers with a painted metal valance filling the space below it. Multi-piece construction became the norm as automakers incorporated grilles, lighting, and even rear exhaust into the bumpers.

On the 1968 Pontiac GTO, General Motors incorporated an "Endura" body-colored plastic front bumper designed to absorb low-speed impact without permanent deformation. It was featured in a TV advertisement with John DeLorean hitting the bumper with a sledgehammer and no damage resulted. Similar elastomeric bumpers were available on the front and rear of the 1970-71 Plymouth Barracuda. In 1971, Renault introduced a plastic bumper (sheet moulding compound) on the Renault 5.

Current design practice is for the bumper structure on modern automobiles to consist of a plastic cover over a reinforcement bar made of steel, aluminum, fiberglass composite, or plastic. Bumpers of most modern automobiles have been made of a combination of polycarbonate (PC) and acrylonitrile butadiene styrene (ABS) called PC/ABS.

Physics
Bumpers offer protection to other vehicle components by dissipating the kinetic energy generated by an impact. This energy is a function of vehicle mass and velocity squared. The kinetic energy is equal to 1/2 the product of the mass and the square of the speed. In formula form:

A bumper that protects vehicle components from damage at 5 miles per hour must be four times stronger than a bumper that protects at 2.5 miles per hour, with the collision energy dissipation concentrated at the extreme front and rear of the vehicle. Small increases in bumper protection can lead to weight gain and loss of fuel efficiency.

Until 1959, such rigidity was seen as beneficial to occupant safety among automotive engineers. Modern theories of vehicle crashworthiness point in the opposite direction, towards vehicles that crumple progressively. A completely rigid vehicle might have excellent bumper protection for vehicle components, but would offer poor occupant safety.

Pedestrian safety
Bumpers are increasingly being designed to mitigate injury to pedestrians struck by cars, such as through the use of bumper covers made of flexible materials. Front bumpers, especially, have been lowered and made of softer materials, such as foams and crushable plastics, to reduce the severity of impact on legs.

Height mismatches

For passenger cars, the height and placement of bumpers are legally specified under both US and EU regulations. Bumpers do not protect against moderate-speed collisions, because during emergency braking, suspension changes the pitch of each vehicle, so bumpers can bypass each other when the vehicles collide. Preventing override and underride can be accomplished by extremely tall bumper surfaces. Active suspension is another solution to keeping the vehicle level.

Bumper height from the roadway surface is important in engaging other protective systems. Airbag deployment sensors typically do not trigger until contact with an obstruction, and it is important that front bumpers be the first parts of a vehicle to make contact in the event of a frontal collision, to leave sufficient time to inflate the protective cushions.

Energy-absorbing crush zones are completely ineffective if they are physically bypassed; an extreme example of this occurs when the elevated platform of a tractor-trailer completely misses the front bumper of a passenger car, and the first contact is with the glass windshield of the passenger compartment.

Truck vs. car
Underride collisions, in which a smaller vehicle such as a passenger sedan slides under a larger vehicle such as a tractor-trailer often result in severe injuries or fatalities. The platform bed of a typical tractor-trailer is at the head height of seated adults in a typical passenger car and thus can cause severe head trauma in even a moderate-speed collision. Around 500 people are killed this way in the United States annually.

Following the June 1967 death of actress Jayne Mansfield in an auto/truck accident, the U.S. National Highway Traffic Safety Administration recommended requiring a rear underride guard, also known as a "Mansfield bar", an "ICC bar", or a "DOT (Department of Transportation) bumper". The U.S. trucking industry has been slow to upgrade this safety feature, and there are no requirements to repair ICC bars damaged in service. However, in 1996 NHTSA upgraded the requirements for the rear underride prevention structure on truck trailers, and Transport Canada went further with an even more stringent requirement for energy-absorbing rear underride guards. In July 2015, NHTSA issued a proposal to upgrade the U.S. performance requirements for underride guards.

Many European nations have also required side underride guards, to mitigate against lethal collisions where the car impacts the truck from the side. A variety of different types of side underride guards of this nature are in use in Japan, the US, and Canada. However, they are not required in the United States.

SUV vs. car
Mismatches between SUV bumper heights and passenger car side impact beams have allowed serious injuries at relatively low speeds. In the United States, NHTSA is studying how to address this issue .

Beyond lethal interactions, repair costs of passenger car/SUV collisions can also be significant due to the height mismatch. This mismatch can result in vehicles being so severely damaged that they are inoperable after low speed collisions.

Regulation
In most jurisdictions, bumpers are legally required on all vehicles. Regulations for automobile bumpers have been implemented for two reasons – to allow the car to sustain a low-speed impact without damage to the vehicle's safety systems, and to protect pedestrians from injury. These requirements are in conflict: bumpers that withstand impact well and minimize repair costs tend to injure pedestrians more, while pedestrian-friendly bumpers tend to have higher repair costs.

Although a vehicle's bumper systems are designed to absorb the energy of low-speed collisions and help protect the car's safety and other expensive components located nearby, most bumpers are designed to meet only the minimum regulatory standards.

International standards 
International safety regulations, originally devised as European standards under the auspices of the United Nations, have now been adopted by most countries outside North America.

Pedestrian safety
European countries have implemented regulations to address the issue of 270,000 deaths annually in worldwide pedestrian/auto accidents.

Bull bars

Specialized bumpers, known as "bull bars" or "roo bars", protect vehicles in rural environments from collisions with large animals. However, studies have shown that such bars increase the threat of death and serious injury to pedestrians in urban environments, because the bull bar is rigid and transmits all force of a collision to the pedestrian, unlike a bumper, which absorbs some force and crumples. In the European Union, the sale of rigid metal bull bars that do not comply with the relevant pedestrian-protection safety standards has been banned.

Off-road bumpers
Off-road vehicles often utilize aftermarket off-road bumpers made of heavy gauge metal to improve clearance (height above terrain), maximize departure angles, clear larger tires, and ensure additional protection. Similar or identical to bull bars, off-road bumpers feature a rigid construction and do not absorb (by plastic deformation) any energy in a collision, which is more dangerous for pedestrians than factory plastic bumpers. The legality of the aftermarket off-road bumpers varies by jurisdiction.

United States

Bumper regulations in the United States focus on preventing low-speed accidents from impairing safe vehicle operation, limiting damage to safety-related vehicle components, and containing the costs of repair after a crash.

First standards 1971

In 1971, the U.S. National Highway Traffic Safety Administration (NHTSA) issued the country's first regulation applicable to passenger car bumpers. Federal Motor Vehicle Safety Standard No. 215 (FMVSS 215), "Exterior Protection," took effect on 1 September 1972—when most automakers would begin producing their model year 1973 vehicles. The requirements effectively eliminated automobile bumper designs that featured integral automotive lighting components such as tail lamps.

In October 1972, the U.S. Congress enacted the Motor Vehicle Information and Cost Saving Act (MVICS), which required NHTSA to issue a bumper standard that yields the "maximum feasible reduction of cost to the public and to the consumer". Factors considered included the costs and benefits of implementation, the standard's effect on insurance costs and legal fees, savings in consumer time and inconvenience, as well as health and safety considerations.

The 1973 model year passenger cars sold in the U.S. used a variety of designs. They ranged from non-dynamic versions with solid rubber guards, to "recoverable" designs with oil and nitrogen filled telescoping shock-absorbers.

There was no provision in the law for consumers to 'opt out' of this protection.

Regulatory effect on design
The regulations specified bumper performance; they did not prescribe any particular bumper design. Nevertheless, many cars for the U.S. market were equipped with bulky, massive, protruding bumpers to comply with the 5-mile-per-hour bumper standard in effect from 1973 to 1982. This often meant additional overall vehicle length, as well as new front and rear designs to incorporate the stronger energy-absorbing bumpers, adding weight to the extremities of the vehicle. Passenger cars featured gap-concealing flexible filler panels between the bumpers and the car's bodywork causing them to have a "massive, blockish look". However, other bumper designs also met the requirements. The 1973 AMC Matador coupe had free-standing bumpers with rubber gaiters alone to conceal the retractable shock absorbers. "Endura" bumpers, compliant with the regulations yet tightly integrated into the front bodywork, were used on models such as the Pontiac Grand Am starting in 1973 and the Chevrolet Monte Carlo starting in 1978, with significantly lower mass than heavy chromed-steel bumpers with separate impact energy absorbers.

The bumper regulations applied to all passenger cars, both American-made and imported. With exceptions including the Volvo 240, Porsche 911, and Rolls-Royce Silver Shadow, European and Asian automakers tended to put compliant bumpers only on cars destined for the U.S. and Canadian markets where the regulations applied. This meant their North American-spec cars tended to look different than versions of the same model sold elsewhere. 
 
U.S. bumper-height requirements effectively made some models, such as the Citroën SM, ineligible for importation to the United States. Unlike international safety regulations, U.S. regulations were written without provision for hydropneumatic suspension.

Zero-damage standards 1976
The requirements promulgated under MVICS were consolidated with the requirements of Federal Motor Vehicle Safety Standard Number 215 (FMVSS 215, "Exterior Protection of Vehicles") and promulgated in March 1976. This new bumper standard was placed in the United States Code of Federal Regulations at 49 CFR 581, separate from the Federal Motor Vehicle Safety Standards at 49CFR571. The new requirements, applicable to 1979-model year passenger cars, were called the "Phase I" standard. At the same time, a zero-damage requirement, "Phase II", was enacted for bumper systems on 1980 and newer cars. The most rigorous requirements applied to 1980 through 1982 model vehicles;  front and rear barrier and pendulum crash tests were required, and no damage was allowed to the bumper beyond a  dent and  displacement from the bumper's original position.

All-wheel-drive "cross-over" cars such as the AMC Eagle were classified as multi-purpose vehicles or trucks, and thus exempt from the passenger car bumper standards.

Stringency reduced in 1982
The recently elected Reagan administration had pledged to use cost–benefit analysis to reduce regulatory burdens on industry, which impacted this standard.

As discussed in detail under Physics, prior to 1959, people believed the stronger the structure, including the bumpers, the safer the car. A later analysis led to the understanding of crumple zones, rather than rigid construction that proved deadly to passengers because the force from impact went straight inside the vehicle and onto the passenger.

NHTSA evaluated the results of its change in 1987, noting it resulted in lower weight and manufacturing costs, offset by higher repair costs.

Despite these findings, consumer and insurance groups both decried the weakened bumper standard. They presented the argument that the 1982 standard increased overall consumer costs without any attendant benefits except to automakers. In 1986, Consumers Union petitioned NHTSA to return to the Phase II standard and disclose bumper strength information to consumers. In 1990, NHTSA rejected that petition.

Consumer information
In the United States, the Insurance Institute for Highway Safety (IIHS) subjects vehicles to low-speed barrier tests and publishes the results, including repair costs. Car makers that do well in these tests tend to publicize the results.

In 1990 the IIHS conducted four crash tests on three different-year examples of the Plymouth Horizon. The results illustrate the effect of the 
changes to the US bumper regulations (repair costs are quoted in 1990 United States dollars):
 1983 Horizon with Phase-II 5-mph bumpers: $287
 1983 Horizon with Phase-I 2.5-mph bumpers: $918
 1990 Horizon: $1,476

Bumpers today
Bumpers today are designed to mitigate injuries to pedestrians and to minimize weight at the ends of the vehicle, thereby increasing occupant protection from progressive crumpling in a serious accident. They are no longer made of steel and rubber, but of a plastic outer fascia over a lightweight, impact-absorbing polystyrene foam core.

Canada
Automobile bumper standards in Canada were first enacted at the same time as those in the United States.

Some automakers chose to provide stronger Canadian-specification bumpers throughout the North American market, while others chose to provide weaker bumpers in the U.S. market. This limited grey import vehicles between the US and Canada.

In early 2009, Canada's regulation shifted to harmonize with US Federal standards and international UN Regulations. As in the U.S., consumer protection groups opposed the change, while Canadian regulators maintained that the  test speed is used worldwide and is more compatible with improved pedestrian protection in vehicle-pedestrian crashes.

See also

Automobile safety
 Buffer (rail transport)
Bumper sticker
Cost–benefit analysis
Crashworthiness
Government failure
Headstock

References

Further reading

Vehicle safety technologies
Automotive body parts
English inventions